Dowlais Top (LNWR) railway station served the village of Dowlais, Merthyr Tydfil, Wales from 1862 to 1962 on the Merthyr, Tredegar and Abergavenny Railway. The station consisted of two platforms with services to both Brecon and Newport. The station closed in 1962 along with the line and has since been demolished. The site now occupied by an industrial estate and trackbed forms part of a one way lane for the Heads of the Valley Road. The old station building has survived as an office.

References 

Disused railway stations in Merthyr Tydfil County Borough
Railway stations in Great Britain opened in 1862
Railway stations in Great Britain closed in 1962
1862 establishments in Wales
1962 disestablishments in Wales
Former London and North Western Railway stations